Kunaysah (also spelled Knisa) is a village in northern Syria located northwest of Homs in the Homs Governorate. According to the Syria Central Bureau of Statistics, Kunaysah had a population of 1,504 in the 2004 census. The village was noted in 1838 by Eli Smith.

References

Bibliography

 

Populated places in Homs District
Alawite communities in Syria